This is a list of films that are based on books about films and television.

Directors and producers

 ** TV miniseries.

Screenwriters

Actresses

 ** TV miniseries.

Actors

Stuntmen

Interviewers, newsreaders, hosts

Columnists and publicists

 * TV movie.

Exhibitors

References

Notes

Bibliography

See also
Pages with the same format
 List of films based on arts books
 List of films based on civics books
 List of films based on crime books
 List of films based on sports books
 List of films based on spy books
 List of films based on war books
 List of films based on westerns

   Return to top of page.

Lists of films based on books